Gracyanne Jacobina Barbosa Vieira is a Brazilian fitness model and Carnaval dancer.

Early career
Barbosa moved from her native town Campo Grande to Rio de Janeiro at the age of 16 to attend law school. However, she faced financial difficulties and started to work as a dancer, soon joining the axé band Tchakabum. She left Tchakabum at the end of 2008 and launched a modeling career.

Rainha de bateria career
Barbosa has been foremost known to the Brazilian public as a rainha de bateria for various samba schools at the Rio Carnival and São Paulo Carnival.

2007: Acadêmicos do Salgueiro
2008-2009: Estação Primeira de Mangueira - Império de Casa Verde
2010: Unidos de Vila Isabel - Império de Casa Verde 
2011: Paraíso do Tuiuti - Império de Casa Verde - Unidos de Manguinhos 
2012: Unidos da Tijuca - Unidos de Manguinhos 
2013: Estação Primeira de Mangueira / Unidos do Jacarezinho (madrinha)
2014-2016: X-9 Paulistana
2018-: União da Ilha do Governador

Men's magazines
Barbosa who had appeared on the cover of the Brazilian Playboy's February 2007 issue, also posed for the cover of Revista Sexy December 2011 issue.

Internet fame
In 2012, photos of Barbosa squatting were uploaded to social media, followed by a workout video. Barbosa's ostensible squat weight (around 450 lbs) caused "an uproar on the bodybuilding forums for months", leading to debates at popular websites such as Bodybuilding.com on the authenticity of the weight plates used by her.

Personal life
On 18 May 2012, Barbosa married pagode and samba singer Belo who was formerly married to Viviane Araújo, another famous rainha de bateria. The ceremony was held at Candelária Church in Rio de Janeiro.

References

External links
Gracyanne Barbosa Official Blog

Living people
People from Campo Grande
Brazilian female models
Brazilian female dancers
Brazilian exercise instructors
1983 births